The 47th Guillermo Mendoza Memorial Scholarship Foundation Box Office Entertainment Awards (GMMSF-BOEA), honored the personalities, movies and TV programs in the Philippines, and  took place on April 17, 2016, at the Novotel Grand Ballroom, Araneta Center, Cubao, Quezon City. The award-giving body honors Filipino actors, actresses and other performers' commercial success, regardless of artistic merit, in the Philippine entertainment industry. The awards night was aired on ABS-CBN's "Sunday Best" on May 1, 2016.

Winners selection

The GMMSF selects the high-ranking Philippine films of 2015 based on total average rankings at box office published results (MMFF has not released the final gross tally for the 2015 edition.) as basis for awarding the three major categories in the awarding ceremonies, The Phenomenal Box Office Star, The Box Office King and The Box Office Queen.

The deliberations were held at the Barrio Fiesta Restaurant in Greenhills, San Juan on February 20, 2016, attended by the representatives of GMMSF. An additional three more categories were introduced in the 2016 edition: the Breakthrough Male and Female Star of Philippine Movies and TV (given to Alden Richards and Maine Mendoza, collectively known as the AlDub loveteam), and the Breakthrough Recording/Performing Artist. (to be given also to Richards). Vice Ganda reprises his title as the Phenomenal Box Office Star with his other kapamilya co-stars namely Coco Martin, John Lloyd Cruz and Bea Alonzo for their blockbuster movies Beauty and the Bestie and A Second Chance. Both are Star Cinema-produced.

Awards
Phenomenal Box Office Star
Bea Alonzo and John Lloyd Cruz (A Second Chance) (tied with) Vice Ganda and Coco Martin (Beauty and the Bestie)
Box Office King
Vic Sotto (My Bebe Love)
Box Office Queen
Ai-Ai Delas Alas (My Bebe Love)
Film Actor of the Year
Jericho Rosales (Walang Forever)
Film Actress of the Year
Jennylyn Mercado (Walang Forever)
Prince of Philippine Movies
Daniel Padilla (Crazy Beautiful You)
Princess of Philippine Movies
Kathryn Bernardo (Crazy Beautiful You)
Prince of Philippine Television
James Reid (On the Wings of Love - ABS-CBN 2)
Princess of Philippine Television
Nadine Lustre (On the Wings of Love - ABS-CBN 2)
Breakthrough Male Star of Philippine Movies and TV
Alden Richards
Breakthrough Female Star of Philippine Movies and TV
Maine Mendoza
Most Popular Love Team of Movies and TV
Enrique Gil and Liza Soberano (Forevermore, Just the Way You Are, Everyday I Love You)
Most Promising Love Team on TV
Andre Paras and Barbie Forteza (The Half Sisters - GMA 7)
Most Promising Male Star
Ken Chan (Destiny Rose – GMA 7)
Most Promising Female Star
Maine Mendoza (My Bebe Love)
Male Concert Performers of the Year
Martin Nievera and Gary Valenciano (The Ultimate Concert at MOA)
Female Concert Performers of the Year
Regine Velasquez and Lani Misalucha (The Ultimate Concert at MOA)
Male Recording Artist of the Year
Jed Madela (Iconic)
Female Recording Artist of the Year
Sarah Geronimo (Perfectly Imperfect)
Promising Male Recording Artist of the Year
Enchong Dee (Chinito Problems)
Promising Female Recording Artist of the Year
Kim Chiu (Chinita Princess)
Promising Male Concert Performer
Darren Espanto (The Birthday Concert)
Promising Female Concert Performer
Maja Salvador (Majasty)
Most Popular Recording/Performing Group
The Company  (Lighthearted)
Most Promising Recording/Performing Group
Harana (Harana)
Most Popular Novelty Singer
Michael Pangilinan (Pare Mahal Mo Raw Ako)
Breakthrough Recording/Performing Artist
Alden Richards (Wish I May)
Most Popular Child Performer
Simon "Onyok" Pineda (Ang Probinsyano - ABS-CBN 2)
Most Popular Film Producer
Star Cinema
Most Popular Screenwriter
Carmi Raymundo and Vangie Valdez (A Second Chance) (tied with) Wenn Deramas (Beauty and the Bestie)
Most Popular Film Director
Cathy Garcia Molina (A Second Chance) (tied with) Wenn Deramas (Beauty and the Bestie)
Most Popular TV Program for News and Public Affairs
Kapuso Mo, Jessica Soho (GMA 7)
Most Popular Daytime Drama
The Half Sisters (GMA 7)
Most Popular Primetime Drama
Forevermore (ABS-CBN 2)
Most Popular TV Talent/Reality Program
Your Face Sounds Familiar (ABS-CBN 2)
Most Popular TV Program for Noontime/Variety
Eat Bulaga! (GMA 7)

Special awardsBert Marcelo Lifetime Achievement AwardJose Manalo, Wally Bayola, Paolo BallesterosCorazon Samaniego Lifetime Achievement AwardVilma SantosHighest Record Rating by a Primetime Teleserye of All TimeAng Probinsyano (ABS-CBN 2) (46.7%)Highest Opening Day Gross of All TimeMy Bebe LoveHighest Record Rating of a Noontime Show of All Time (Local & Global)Eat Bulaga! - AlDub: Sa Tamang Panahon event @ Philippine Arena (50.8%)Highest Grossing Historical Film of All TimeHeneral LunaPosthumous Award for Entertainment Excellence & Star Builder'''
German Moreno

Notes

References

Box Office Entertainment Awards
2016 film awards
2016 television awards
2016 music awards